Tobias Müller (born 31 May 1993) is a German footballer who plays as a midfielder for Chemnitzer FC.

Career

Müller joined Dynamo Dresden's youth setup from SC Borea Dresden in 2010, and was promoted to the first team two years later. He made his debut on the professional league level in the 2. Bundesliga on 1 February 2013 when he started in a match against MSV Duisburg. In his second appearance for Dynamo he came on as a substitute for Lynel Kitambala and scored twice a 3–1 victory over SV Sandhausen which ended a run of seven games without a win for the club.

References

External links

Tobias Müller at Kicker

1993 births
Living people
Dynamo Dresden players
Dynamo Dresden II players
Hallescher FC players
2. Bundesliga players
3. Liga players
Association football midfielders
German footballers